The 2010–11 CEV Champions League was the 52nd edition of the highest level European volleyball club competition organised by the European Volleyball Confederation.

Participating teams

League round
24 teams were drawn to 6 pools of 4 teams each.
The 1st – 2nd ranked qualified for the Playoffs 12.
The organizer of the Final Four was determined after the end of the League Round and qualifies directly for the Final Four.
The team of the organizer of  the Final Four was replaced by the 3rd ranked team with the best score.
The four next  3rd ranked teams moved to CEV Cup. The remaining teams were eliminated.

All times are local.

Pool A

Pool B

Pool C

Pool D

Pool E

Pool F

Playoffs

Playoff 12

First leg

Second leg

Playoff 6

First leg

Second leg

Final Four
Organizer:  Trentino BetClic
 Place: Bolzano
All times on 26 March are Central European Time (UTC+01:00) and all times on 27 March are Central European Summer Time (UTC+02:00).

Semifinals

3rd place match

Final

Final standings

Awards

Most Valuable Player
  Osmany Juantorena (Trentino BetClic)
Best Scorer
  Maxim Mikhaylov (Zenit Kazan)
Best Spiker
  Matey Kaziyski (Trentino BetClic)
Best Server
  Sergey Tetyukhin (Zenit Kazan)
Best Blocker
  Aleksandr Abrosimov (Zenit Kazan)
Best Receiver
  Péter Veres (Dynamo Moscow)
Best Libero
  Andrea Bari (Trentino BetClic)
Best Setter
  Lloy Ball (Zenit Kazan)

External links
 2011 CEV Champions League

CEV Champions League
2010 in volleyball
2011 in volleyball